Bossi may refer to:

 Bossi (surname)
 Bossi (organ builders), an Italian organ builders
 Betty Bossi, a Swiss cookbook publisher
 , an ice hockey tournament named for Luciano Bossi
 Stefan Bossems of Cosmic Gate, a German musician with the pseudonym "DJ Bossi"
 Dario Bossi, a fictional character from the video game series Castlevania

See also
 Bosse (disambiguation)